Bishop Hall Jubilee School is located at 2C Oxford Road in Kowloon Tong, Kowloon, Hong Kong.

Bishop Hall Jubilee School was founded by the Sheng Kung Hui in 1961 to commemorate the Silver Jubilee of the consecration of Ronald Hall as the Anglican Bishop of the Diocese of Hong Kong, Macao and South China. It is a co-educational government-subsidized EMI secondary school.

History 
Bishop Hall Jubilee School, a band one EMI school, was established in 1961 to commemorate the Silver Jubilee of Ronald Hall, who was Anglican Bishop of Victoria from 1932 to 1951 and Bishop of the Diocese of Hong Kong and Macao from 1951 to 1966. The school first used the campus of Heep Yunn School, relocating in 1962 to its present address in Oxford Road, Kowloon Tong.

The school has had six principals:

There have been over 7,000 graduates of the school.

School Teams 
 Athletics
 Badminton
 Basketball
 Cross Country
 Football
 Handball 
 Indoor Rowing
 Skateboarding
 Swimming
 Table Tennis
 Taekwondo
 Volleyball
 Junior Choir
 Senior Choir
 Orchestra
 Wind Band
 Chinese Debate
 Chinese Drama
 English Debate
 English Drama
 Folk Dance
 Mathematics
 World Scholar's Cup

Sister Schools Scheme 
 Heep Yunn School
 SKH Holy Trinity Church Secondary School
 Mary Rose School

External Links 
 Bishop Hall Jubilee School
 Bishop Hall Jubilee School Alumni
 Bishop Hall Jubilee School Canada Alumni
Protestant secondary schools in Hong Kong
Kowloon Tsai